Parkville is a city in Platte County, Missouri, United States and is a part of the Kansas City Metropolitan Area.  The population was 7,177 at the 2020 census (2021 est, 7,810).  Parkville is known for its antique shops, art galleries, and historic downtown.  The city is home to Park University, English Landing Park, Platte Landing Park, and the National Golf Club of Kansas City.  Large neighborhoods in Parkville include: Riss Lake, The National, Thousand Oaks, Creekside, Parkville Heights, River Hills, Riverchase, The Bluffs, Downtown, and Pinecrest.

History
A post office called Parkville was established in 1841, named for settler George S. Park. The town of Parkville was platted in 1844 That post office closed in 1962.

The Benjamin Banneker School, Mackay Building, Charles Smith Scott Memorial Observatory, Waddell "A" Truss Bridge, and Washington Chapel C.M.E. Church are listed on the National Register of Historic Places.

Geography
Parkville is located at  (39.195602, -94.683636). The city is fairly hilly and borders the Missouri River and Kansas City, Missouri.

Demographics

2020 census
As of the census of 2020, there were 7,177 people and 2,397 households living in the city (2021 est, 7,810). The racial makeup of the city was 85.6% White, 5.1% Asian, 4.5% Hispanic or Latino, 1.4% African American, and 3.5% from two or more races.

The average household size was 3.43.

The median age in the city was 39.0 years. 27.9% of residents were under the age of 18; 61.1% were from 18 to 64; and 11.0% were 65 years of age or older. The gender makeup of the city was 52% male and 48% female.

The median income for a household in the city was $144,127 and the median income for a family was $174,594. About 0.1% of the population was below the poverty line.

About 71% of the population held a Bachelor's degree or higher and 98% were high school graduates.  Households with a computer: 96%; households with broadband Internet access: 94%.

2010 census
As of the census of 2010, there were 5,554 people, 1,974 households, and 1,469 families living in the city. The racial makeup of the city was 89.5% White, 4.0% African American, 0.1% Native American, 3.0% Asian, 0.3% Pacific Islander, 0.6% from other races, and 2.5% from two or more races. Hispanic or Latino of any race were 3.7% of the population.

There were 1,974 households, of which 37.4% had children under the age of 18 living with them, 63.6% were married couples living together, 6.6% had a female householder with no husband present, 4.2% had a male householder with no wife present, and 25.6% were non-families. 20.9% of all households were made up of individuals, and 5.8% had someone living alone who was 65 years of age or older. The average household size was 2.61 and the average family size was 3.05.

The median age in the city was 39.1 years. 25.6% of residents were under the age of 18; 12.7% were between the ages of 18 and 24; 20% were from 25 to 44; 32.6% were from 45 to 64; and 9.1% were 65 years of age or older.

2000 census
As of the census of 2000, there were 4,059 people, 1,510 households, and 1,060 families living in the city. The population density was 586.9 people per square mile (226.5/km). There were 1,587 housing units at an average density of 229.5 per square mile (88.5/km). The racial makeup of the city was 90.37% White, 4.71% African American, 0.52% Native American, 1.31% Asian, 0.96% Pacific Islander, 0.81% from other races, and 1.33% from two or more races. Hispanic or Latino of any race were 2.27% of the population.

There were 1,510 households, out of which 37.4% had children under the age of 18 living with them, 59.1% were married couples living together, 7.7% had a female householder with no husband present, and 29.8% were non-families. 23.8% of all households were made up of individuals, and 5.6% had someone living alone who was 65 years of age or older. The average household size was 2.54 and the average family size was 3.04.

In the city, the population was spread out, with 26.4% under the age of 18, 12.4% from 18 to 24, 29.9% from 25 to 44, 25.2% from 45 to 64, and 6.1% who were 65 years of age or older. The median age was 36 years. For every 100 females, there were 95.0 males. For every 100 females age 18 and over, there were 93.5 males.

The median income for a household in the city was $68,600, and the median income for a family was $86,820. Males had a median income of $64,917 versus $31,740 for females. The per capita income for the city was $33,119. About 5.0% of families and 6.5% of the population were below the poverty line, including 8.1% of those under age 18 and 3.3% of those age 65 or over.

Education
Park Hill School District operates one school in Parkville: Graden Elementary School.

Park University, a private institution, has been in operation at Parkville since 1875.

Parkville has a public library, a branch of the Mid-Continent Public Library.

Notable people
 Bill Grigsby, American sportscaster and member of the Missouri Sports Hall of Fame.
 George S. Park, Texas War of Independence hero, and founder of Parkville, Park University, and Manhattan, Kansas.
 Frank Ringo, professional baseball player from 1880 to 1888.

References

External links
 
 Parkville Chamber of Commerce
 The Landmark, newspaper
 The Platte County Citizen, newspaper

Cities in Platte County, Missouri
Missouri populated places on the Missouri River
Cities in Missouri
Populated places established in 1844
1844 establishments in Missouri